Slice is a Canadian English language discretionary service channel owned by Corus Entertainment. The channel primarily broadcasts reality shows targeting young adult women, typically dealing in subjects such as fashion and lifestyles.

This channel was launched on January 1, 1995, as Life Network under the ownership of Atlantis Communications. Atlantis was acquired by Alliance Communications in 1998 and Life Network was relaunched as Slice on March 5, 2007. In 2008, Canwest and Goldman Sachs acquired Alliance Atlantis, and the channel's ownership was later sold at first to Shaw Media in 2010 and ultimately, Corus Entertainment in April 2016.

History

As Life Network
In June 1994, Your Channel Television Inc., a company majority owned by Atlantis Television Ventures Inc. (Atlantis Communications), was granted a television broadcasting licence by the Canadian Radio-television and Telecommunications Commission (CRTC) for a channel called YOU: Your Channel, described at the time as broadcasting "programming consisting of documentaries and information programming." The channel was grouped into five themes, "Habitat" stressing programming for the home and environment; "Bodyworks" covering fitness, health and nutrition; "Food Plus" including programs related to cooking and food; "Explorations" dealing with travel, adventure and nature; and "Relationships" focusing on parenting, child care, careers and personal relationships."

The channel was launched on January 1, 1995, as Life Network. The channel broadcast programs in themes focusing on such areas as food, gardening, and home design.

In June 1998, Atlantis Communications announced that it planned to merge with Alliance Communications, another fellow television and film producer and broadcaster, owners of History Television and Showcase at the time, to form a new company called Alliance Atlantis Communications. The CRTC approved the merger in May 1999.

As Slice
Plans to relaunch the channel as Slice were announced in November 2, 2006 by Alliance Atlantis Communications. The new name and programming reflects Life's shift towards a more entertainment based schedule with what Alliance Atlantis called "addictive" programming. The name was revealed in a 2006 Life Network online survey on future programming strategies. The channel was relaunched on March 5, 2007, although the on-air branding appeared intermittently during a "sneak preview" on March 3 and 4.

On January 18, 2008, a joint venture between Canwest and Goldman Sachs Capital Partners known as CW Media, acquired control of Slice through its purchase of Alliance Atlantis' broadcasting assets, which were placed in a trust in August 2007. On October 27, 2010, ownership changed again as Shaw Communications gained control of Slice as a result of its acquisition of Canwest and Goldman Sachs' interest in CW Media.

On May 29, 2013, a high definition simulcast of Slice was launched. It is available through all major TV providers.

On April 1, 2016, Shaw Media was sold to Corus Entertainment.

Programming

Slice is known to air numerous shows from the U.S. cable network, Bravo, in addition to producing several original programs of its own.

Notable programs
 72 Hours
  Below Deck (original and spin offs)
 Big Brother: After Dark
 Big Brother Canada  
 Big Brother Canada Side Show
 Casino Confidential
 Dogs with Jobs
 Ex-Wives of Rock
 Four Weddings Canada
 Friends
 Kendra on Top
 King of the Nerds
 Law and Order: Special Victims Unit
 Mob Wives
 My Teenage Wedding
 Princess (TV series)
 See no Evil
 Til Debt Do Us Part 
 The Hero
 The Real Housewives of Atlanta
 The Real Housewives of Beverly Hills
 The Real Housewives of Dallas
 The Real Housewives of Miami
 The Real Housewives of New York City
 The Real Housewives of New Jersey
 The Real Housewives of Orange County
 The Real Housewives of Potomac
 The Real Housewives of Vancouver
 The Real Housewives of Toronto
 Wedding SOS

Logos

References

External links

Analog cable television networks in Canada
Television channels and stations established in 1995
1995 establishments in Canada
Corus Entertainment networks
English-language television stations in Canada
Women's interest channels